Defence Nuclear Accident Response Organisation (NARO) is maintained by the UK Ministry of Defence (MOD) to respond to an accident or incident, including one arising through terrorist acts, involving defence nuclear assets.

Defence Nuclear Assets include:
 Naval Nuclear Reactors; to include all operational Royal Navy submarine reactors
 Defence nuclear reactor fuel
 Nuclear Weapons and radioactive components
 Radioactive material on defence nuclear sites, which warrants implementation of the site emergency arrangements

The aim of the NARO is to ensure, in conjunction with the appropriate civil agencies, an effective response to a defence nuclear accident. The key objective is to protect public health and safety.

The MOD has two key responsibilities in the maintenance and provision of a nuclear accident response capability in the event of a defence nuclear accident:
The MOD has executive responsibilities for the safe operation of its nuclear programmes and for the post accident render safe and recovery operations
The MOD is nominated by the Cabinet Office as the UK Lead Government Department to coordinate the Central Government response to a Defence Nuclear Accident, and for liaison with the Devolved Administrations as appropriate (The Central Government response is coordinated through the Nuclear Accident Information Advisory Group, NAIAG)

The NARO consists of military and civilian personnel from across the MOD, who provide a wide range of skills and expertise, including: nuclear safety, radiological monitoring, command and control, mapping, information management and security.
The MOD conducts a regular series of exercises, involving local authorities, local emergency services and agencies across government, in order to ensure the effectiveness of the nuclear accident emergency plans. In the unlikely event of a defence nuclear accident, the MOD would support the emergency services and local authorities as appropriate.

References

Ministry of Defence (United Kingdom)
Ministry of Defence Police
Trident (UK nuclear programme)